Stepan Mikhailovich Kirichuk (Russian: Степан Михайлович Киричук; Berlarusian: Сцяпан Міхайлавіч Кірычук; born in 18 May 1949), is a Belarusian-Russian politician who is currently a member of the Tyumen City Duma since 9 September 2018.

He had recently served as a member of the Federation Council of from the executive authority of Tyumen Oblast from 2005 to 2018. 

Kirichuk also served as the 1st Head of Administration of Tyumen from 1993 to 2005.

He is a member of the United Russia party.

He was a ember of the scientific and editorial board of the Great Tyumen Encyclopedia in 2004.

He is a candidate of technical sciences as of 1999, a doctor of sociological sciences, associate professor, honorary professor of the Tyumen State Academy of Architecture and Construction, full member of the Municipal Academy of Russia.

Biography

Stepan Kirichuk was born in 18 May 1949 to his father, Mikhail Yakovlyevich, and his mother, Maria Stepanovna.

In 1968, after graduating from the Brest College of Railway Transport, he began working as a repair worker at the track machine station No. 170 in Tyumen.

From 1968 to 1970, he served in the Soviet Army. Since 1970 he continued to work in the Tyumen track distance. He was a track worker, then a foreman, foreman, chief engineer. In 1977, he was promoted as the head of the Tyumen track distance.

In 1985, he graduated from the Ural Electromechanical Institute of Railway Engineers. In the same year, he was appointed deputy head of the Tyumen branch of the Sverdlovsk railway.

From 1990 to 1991, he was the Chairman of the Kalinin District Council of People's Deputies. From 1991 to 1993, he was the Chairman of the Tyumen City Council of People's Deputies.

In January 1993, Kirichuk became the Head of Administration of Tyumen. Since 1999, he is a candidate of technical sciences. In 2005, he defended his dissertation for the degree of Doctor of Social Sciences.

He was elected to the governing bodies of the Union of Russian Cities, the Association of Siberian and Far Eastern Cities, the Association of the City of the Urals. He was the president of the Association of municipalities of the Tyumen Oblast. He is an Active member of the Municipal Academy of Russia.

On 23 March 2005, Kirichuk became a member of the Federation Council of from the executive authority of Tyumen Oblast.

In July 2006, he was elected president of the All-Russian Congress of Municipalities.

From 25 November 2011 to 14 September 2014, he was the Chairman of the Federation Council Committee on Federal Structure, Regional Policy, Local Self-Government and Northern Affairs. He was the First Deputy of this Committee back then.

In September 2018, Kirichuk was elected to the Tyumen City Duma in single-mandate constituency No. 10, he ran as a self-nominated candidate. In the parliament, he is the Chairman of the Standing Committee of the City Duma on City Public Administration.

Family

He is married to Galina Nikolayevna Kirichuk, and has two sons.

References

1949 births
Living people
United Russia politicians